The Hans Christian 33, also called the Hans Christian 33 Traditional and the Traditional 33, is a Taiwanese sailboat that was designed by Harwood Ives as a blue-water cruiser and first built in 1980.

The design is a development of the Hans Christian 38 and 42.

Production
The design was commissioned from Harwood Ives by Hans Christian Yachts founder John Edwards circa 1979. Ives was paid for his work with a production Hans Christian 33. The design was initially built by Hans Christian Yachts at the Hansa Yachts Und Shifbau yard in Taiwan. Production then passed in 1987 to the Shing Fa Boatbuilding Company, also in Taiwan. Disagreements with several boat building yards resulted in some of the completed boats being sold under various other names. In 1990 production was moved to Thailand in search of cheaper labour and lower taxes under the name Dutch East Indes Trading Company, although the company seems to have completed only one boat before production was moved to Andersen Yachts. In 2004 production moved again to a New Zealander-owned company, Pantawee Marine, still in Thailand, using the model name Traditional 33. The design was still available in 2018, although it is unlikely any were built after 2009. By 2019 that company was also out of business. A total of 168 boats were constructed from 1980 to 2018.

Design
The Hans Christian 33 is a recreational keelboat, built predominantly of fiberglass, with wood trim. It has a cutter rig, a spooned raked stem, a bulbous rounded transom, a keel-mounted rudder controlled by a wheel, an optional bowsprit and a fixed long keel. It displaces  and carries  of iron ballast.

The below decks accommodation is unconventional, with a double Pullman berth aft on the starboard side and another forward on the port side. The galley is on the port side at the foot of the companionway steps, and is just aft of the dinette table. The galley includes a three-burner gimballed stove and an icebox. The dinette table does not convert to a berth, but the starboard settee does, for a total sleeping accommodation for five people. The head is located in the very bow and includes a hanging locker and a shower. There are provisions for a generator and also for air conditioning.

The boat makes extensive use of teak above decks and mahogany below. The cockpit, the decks and the cabin trunk roof are all made from teak. Ventilation is provided by three pairs of dorade vents, two hatches and six opening bronze ports. Sheet and halyard winches are located on the cockpit coaming and on the mast.

The design has a Portsmouth Yardstick racing average handicap of 95.0.

Operational history
In a 1992 review Richard Sherwood wrote, "this is a small ocean cruiser that evolved from the Hans Christian 38 and 42. The design emphasizes appearance and cruising accommodations. The rudder is very large and, for a full-keel boat, far aft."

A 2015 review in Blue Water Boats, noted of its sailing qualities, "Under sail, she's seakindly without the tendency to bounce or bob over waves and owners report hoving-to in relatively high comfort when the going gets rough. Fully laden at over 25,000 lbs in typical cruising trim there can be no expectation for fast passages yet the HC33 can perform well, you can expect easy 125 mile days in the trades and we've heard of a 7 knot overall average from Mexico to San Francisco via Hawaii."

A 2017 used boat review by Jack Hornor in the SpinSheet concluded, "The Hans Christian 33 is a stout, safe, and comfortable bluewater cruiser that is reasonably priced. But, be aware that these will be high maintenance boats to keep in Bristol fashion, and age will take its toll on teak decks. If your love of this style overwhelms your practical side, she will also make a very handsome coastal cruiser or day sailer."

See also
List of sailing boat types

Similar sailboats
Abbott 33
Alajuela 33
Arco 33
C&C 33
Cape Dory 33
Cape Dory 330
CS 33
Endeavour 33
Hunter 33
Hunter 33.5
Mirage 33
Nonsuch 33
Tanzer 10
Viking 33
Watkins 33

References

Keelboats
1980s sailboat type designs
Sailing yachts
Sailboat type designs by Harwood Ives
Sailboat types built by Hans Christian Yachts
Sailboat types built by Hansa Yachts Und Shifbau
Sailboat types built by Shing Fa Boatbuilding Company
Sailboat types built by Dutch East Indes Trading Company
Sailboat types built by Andersen Yachts
Sailboat types built by Pantawee Marine